Frank Lavernia (3 April 1918 – 19 April 2005) was a Cuban basketball player. He competed in the men's tournament at the 1948 Summer Olympics.

References

1918 births
2005 deaths
Cuban men's basketball players
Olympic basketball players of Cuba
Basketball players at the 1948 Summer Olympics
Sportspeople from Camagüey